Édouard Eugène Onésime Boucheron (10 February 1904 — 2 June 1996) was a French racing cyclist. A professional from 1926 to 1937, he participated in six-day racing.

Road cycling record 
 1926
 Champion de France des aspirants
 Limoges-Saint-Léonard-Limoges
 3rd place in the Tour de Corrèze
 1927
 1st place in the Circuit boussaquin
 2nd place in the Paris-Épernay race

Track cycling record 
 1928
 Six Days of Paris (with Alessandro Tonani)
 Prix du Salon (with Alessandro Tonani)
 2nd place in the Six Days of Milan
 1929
 3rd place in the Six Days of Saint-Étienne
 3rd place in the Prix Hourlier-Comès
 1930
 Prix Dupré-Lapize (with Armand Blanchonnet)
 1931
 3rd place in the Six Days of Paris
 1932
 3rd place in the Prix du Salon
 1934
 3rd place in the Prix Hourlier-Comès
 1936
 2nd place in the Six Days of Saint-Étienne
 1937
 3rd place in the Six Days of Saint-Étienne

References

External links 
Onesime BOUCHERON at CycleBase
Edouard Eugene Onesime Boucheron at le site du cyclisme (in French)

1904 births
1996 deaths
French male cyclists
French track cyclists
Sportspeople from Loiret